Upper motor neuron syndrome (UMNS) is the motor control changes that can occur in skeletal muscle after an upper motor neuron lesion.

Following upper motor neuron lesions, affected muscles potentially have many features of altered performance including:
weakness (decreased ability for the muscle to generate force)
decreased motor control including decreased speed, accuracy and dexterity
altered muscle tone (hypotonia or hypertonia) – a decrease or increase in the baseline level of muscle activity
decreased endurance
exaggerated deep tendon reflexes including spasticity, and clonus (a series of involuntary rapid muscle contractions)

Such signs are collectively termed the "upper motor neuron syndrome". Affected muscles typically show multiple signs, with severity depending on the degree of damage and other factors that influence motor control. In neuroanatomical circles, it is often joked, for example, that hemisection of the cervical spinal cord leads to an "upper lower motor neuron syndrome and a lower upper motor neuron syndrome". The saying refers to lower motor neuron symptoms in the upper extremity (arm) and upper motor neurons symptoms in the lower extremity (leg).

Health professionals' understanding of impairments in muscles after an upper motor neuron lesion has progressed considerably in recent decades. However, a diagnosis of "spasticity" is still often used interchangeably with upper motor neuron syndrome, and it is not unusual to see patients labeled as spastic who demonstrate an array of UMN findings.

Spasticity is an exaggerated stretch reflex, which means that a muscle has a reflex contraction when stretched, and that this contraction is stronger when the stretch is applied more quickly. The commonly quoted definition by Lance (1980) describes "a motor disorder, characterised by a velocity-dependent increase in tonic stretch reflexes with exaggerated tendon jerks, resulting from hyper-excitability of the stretch reflex as one component of the upper motor neurone (UMN) syndrome".

Spasticity is a common feature of muscle performance after upper motor neuron lesions, but is generally of much less clinical significance than other features such as decreased strength, decreased control and decreased endurance. The confusion in the use of the terminology complicates assessment and treatment planning by health professionals, as many confuse the other findings of upper motor neuron syndrome and describe them as spasticity. This confusion potentially leaves health professionals attempting to inhibit an exaggerated stretch reflex to improve muscle performance, potentially leaving more significant UMNS changes such as weakness unaddressed. Improved understanding of the multiple features of the upper motor neuron syndrome supports more rigorous assessment, and improved treatment planning.

Presentation
The upper motor neuron syndrome signs are seen in conditions where motor areas in the brain and/or spinal cord are damaged or fail to develop normally. These include spinal cord injury, cerebral palsy, multiple sclerosis and acquired brain injury including stroke. The impact of impairment of muscles for an individual is problems with movement, and posture, which often affects their function.

Diagnosis

Assessment of motor control may involve several health professionals depending on the affected individual's situation, and the severity of their condition. This may include physical therapists, physicians (including neurologists and physiatrists) and rehabilitation physicians, orthotists, occupational therapists, and speech-language pathologists. Assessment is needed of the affected individual's goals, their function, and any symptoms that may be related to the movement disorder, such as pain. A thorough assessment then uses a clinical reasoning approach to determine why difficulties are occurring. Elements of assessment will include analysis of posture, active movement, muscle strength, movement control and coordination, and endurance, as well as muscle tone and spasticity. Impaired muscles typically demonstrate a loss of selective movement, including a loss of eccentric control (decreased ability to actively lengthen); this decreased active lengthening of a muscle is a key factor that limits motor control. While multiple muscles in a limb are usually affected in the Upper Motor Neuron Syndrome, there is usually an imbalance of muscle activity (muscle tone), such that there is a stronger pull on one side of a joint, such as into elbow flexion. Decreasing the degree of this imbalance is a common focus of muscle strengthening programs. Impaired motor control also typically features a loss of stabilisation of an affected limb or the head from the trunk, so a thorough assessment requires this to be analysed as well, and exercise to improve proximal stability may be indicated.

Secondary effects are likely to impact on assessment of impaired muscles. If muscle tone is assessed with passive muscle lengthening, increased muscle stiffness may affect the feeling of resistance to passive stretch, in addition to neurological resistance to stretch. Other secondary changes such as loss of muscle fibres following acquired muscle weakness are likely to compound the weakness arising from the upper motor neuron lesion. In severely affected muscles, there may be marked secondary changes, such as muscle contracture, particularly if management has been delayed or absent.

Treatment

Treatment should be based on assessment by the relevant health professionals. For muscles with mild-to-moderate impairment, exercise should be the mainstay of management, and is likely to need to be prescribed by a physical therapist or other health professional skilled in neurological rehabilitation.

Muscles with severe impairment are likely to be more limited in their ability to exercise, and may require help to do this. They may require additional interventions, to manage the greater neurological impairment and also greater secondary complications. These interventions may include serial casting, flexibility exercise such as sustained positioning programs, and medical interventions.

Research has clearly shown that exercise is beneficial for impaired muscles, even though it was previously believed that strength exercise would increase muscle tone and impair muscle performance further. Also, in previous decades there has been a strong focus on other interventions for impaired muscles, particularly stretching and splinting, but the evidence does not support these as effective. One of the challenges for health professionals working with UMNS movement disorders is that the degree of muscle weakness makes developing an exercise programme difficult. For muscles that lack any volitional control, such as after complete spinal cord injury, exercise may be assisted, and may require equipment, such as using a standing frame to sustain a standing position. Often, muscles require specific stimulation to achieve small amounts of activity, which is most often achieved by weight-bearing (e.g. positioning and supporting a limb such that it supports body weight) or by stimulation to the muscle belly (such as electrical stimulation or vibration).

Medical interventions may include such medications as baclofen, diazepam, dantrolene, or clonazepam. Phenol injections or botulinum toxin injections into a muscle belly of the upper or lower extremities can be used to attempt to dampen the signals between nerve and muscle. The effectiveness of medications varies between individuals, and varies based on location of the upper motor neuron lesion (in the brain or the spinal cord). Medications are commonly used for movement disorders, but research has not shown functional benefit for some drugs. Some studies have shown that medications have been effective in decreasing spasticity, but that this has not been accompanied by functional benefits.

See also
Stroke rehabilitation
Strength training
Cerebral palsy
Spinal cord injury
Acquired brain injury
Physiotherapy
Traumatic brain injury
Motor control

References 

Motor control
Syndromes